Godfrey Meynell VC, MC (20 May 1904 – 29 September 1935) was a British Indian Army officer and an English recipient of the Victoria Cross, the highest and most prestigious award for gallantry in the face of the enemy that can be awarded to British and Commonwealth forces.

Early life and education
Meynell was the son of an army officer who was also named Godfrey Meynell, by his wife Edith Violet Cammell. He won a scholarship to Eton College. He was commended to Cyril Connolly when he arrived there as a boy with character. After an initial amount of bullying, (from Godfrey to Cecil)  the two became firm friends as described in Enemies of Promise.

Military career
Meynell had graduated 13th at Sandhurst before he volunteered for the British Indian Army. He was awarded the Military Cross in 1933 for his work in Chitral.

Victoria Cross
Meynell was thirty-one years old, and a captain in the 5th Battalion (Queen Victoria's Own Corps of Guides), 12th Frontier Force Regiment during the 1935 Mohmand Campaign in British India. Captain Meynell married "Jill", Sophia Patricia (Jill) Lowis, at the Guides Chapel in Mardan on 31 January 1933, both were speakers of Urdu. Their eldest son Godfrey was born on 20 July 1934.

On 29 September 1935 at Mohmand, in the Nahaqi Pass within the Khyber Pass on the North West Frontier, in the final phase of an attack, Captain Meynell, seeking information on the most forward troops, found them involved in a struggle against an enemy vastly superior in numbers. He at once took command, and with two Lewis guns and about thirty men, maintained a heavy and accurate fire on the advancing enemy, whose overwhelming numbers nevertheless succeeded in reaching the position and putting the Lewis guns out of action. In the hand-to-hand struggle which ensued, Captain Meynell was mortally wounded, but the heavy casualties inflicted on the enemy prevented them from exploiting their success.
Regimental records suggest that when the bodies of his men were mutilated by the enemy (as was their custom), Captain Meynell sought to defend those bodies even as he himself was dying.

His body is laid to rest at the Guides Chapel in Mardan, near Peshawar in the North West Frontier Province (of what is now Pakistan), where he and his wife Sophia Patricia (but known as Jill) née Lowis were married. 
According to shipping records, his widow returned to England with their eldest son accompanied by her twin brother (and his brother officer) "Jack" (Ross Henry) Lowis and they arrived in England after a 10 day sea journey at the end of October, within one month of Godfrey Meynell VC MC's death.

Three months after he was killed, news of the award of the VC arrived at Meynell Langley on 24 December 1935. Three months later their 2nd son, Hugo Anthony Meynell, was born on 24 March 1936 and less than three months later his widow Jill (Sophia Patricia née Lowis) received the VC at a ceremony at Buckingham Palace on 14 July 1936, the only one to be handed out by Edward VIII.

References

1904 births
1935 deaths
People educated at Eton College
British recipients of the Victoria Cross
British Indian Army officers
British Indian Army personnel killed in action
People from Amber Valley
Graduates of the Royal Military College, Sandhurst
Corps of Guides (India) officers
British military personnel of the Second Mohmand Campaign
Military personnel from Derbyshire
British people in colonial India